Georges Clement Nyeck Nyobe or Nyeck Nyobe (born March 18, 1983) is a Cameroonian footballers who is currently a free agent .

External links 
 Profile at Liga Indonesia Official Site

Cameroonian footballers
Living people
Expatriate footballers in Indonesia
1983 births
Liga 1 (Indonesia) players
Association football defenders
Persib Bandung players
Persela Lamongan players
PSMS Medan players
Bontang F.C. players